Mance is a populated place within Northampton Township, a minor civil division of Somerset County, Pennsylvania. The place is a popular spot for railfans as it's alongside Sand Patch Grade's (Keystone Subdivision) "horseshoe curve", where an old (no longer in service, now privately owned) U.S. Post Office also exists.

References 

Populated places in Pennsylvania